A centered tetrahedral number is a centered figurate number that represents a tetrahedron. The centered tetrahedral number for a specific n is given by

The first such numbers are 1, 5, 15, 35, 69, 121, 195, 295, 425, 589, 791, ... .

Parity and divisibility
Every centered tetrahedral number is odd. 
Every centered tetrahedral number with an index of 2, 3 or 4 modulo 5 is divisible by 5.

References

Figurate numbers